Michael Holloway (born July 25, 1976) is a former reality TV show contestant, who was the winner of the 30th season of the U.S. reality TV series Survivor. In his private life, he used to work as an oil driller from North Richland Hills, Texas. Since winning Survivor, he has become a commercial real estate agent.

Early life
Holloway was born in Odessa, Texas. As a teenager, he attended L. D. Bell High School in suburban Hurst.

According to his CBS Survivor biography, he grew up without a father and had also been both molested and teased in his youth.

Survivor
In 2014, Holloway became one of 18 players selected for Survivor: Worlds Apart, the 30th season of Survivor. At the start of the game, Holloway was placed on the "Blue Collar” tribe, Escameca. Early on, he formed a close alliance with two tribe members, Kelly Remington and Dan Foley. However, Holloway began to earn the ire of other tribe members Rodney Lavoie, Jr., Lindsey Cascaddan, and Sierra Dawn Thomas when he repeatedly insisted that the tribe do more work around camp. Nevertheless, the tribe did well in challenges and Holloway was soon viewed as the leader, and in the tribe’s only immunity challenge loss, Holloway organized the elimination of Cascaddan.

When the tribes were redistributed in the fifth episode, Holloway remained on the Escameca tribe, along with Foley, Lavoie, Thomas, former White Collars Tyler Fredrickson and Joaquin Souberbielle, and former No Collar Joe Anglim. For the final challenge before the merge, Holloway decided to help his tribe throw the challenge to help protect Remington, on the other tribe; Holloway aligned with Anglim, Foley, and Thomas to eliminate Souberbielle, in a blindside which angered Souberbielle's close friend Lavoie and would eventually turn him against Holloway.

Once the merge arrived, Holloway came up with the merged tribe’s name, Merica. He then re-added Remington to his Blue Collar alliance, and also brought in former White Collars Fredrickson and Carolyn Rivera, and former No Collar Will Sims II. However, Lavoie had plans to avenge Souberbielle and began forming a sub-alliance with the intent of blindsiding Holloway in the future.  Holloway later discovered this plot, and at the subsequent Survivor Auction, he held out from participating in order to have all of his money for a game advantage.  Even though he had joined all of the castaways in agreeing to purchase letters from their loved ones, he sneakily reneged; but after earning the ire of his tribe-mates, he relented.  Since he had bought his letter after all, he had to compete with Rivera and Foley in a lottery to earn the advantage, which Holloway lost. All this, coupled with his attempted outing of Lavoie for trying to back-stab him, resulted in Holloway's ouster from the majority alliance.  He then aligned with former No Collar Jenn Brown and former White Collar Shirin Oskooi.

Ultimately, Holloway managed to avoid elimination by winning five of the last six immunity challenges; the one time he lost, he played the Hidden Immunity Idol which he had found, and successfully negated the votes cast against him, eliminating Fredrickson instead. After winning the final immunity challenge on Day 38, Holloway planned to take Rivera and Sims to the end with him, and forced a tied vote between Rivera and Lavoie, thus necessitating a fire-making challenge that Holloway prepared Rivera for earlier that day. His plan was successful, and Lavoie became the eighth and final member of the jury. Months later, on May 20, 2015, it was revealed that the jury of eight ultimately awarded Holloway the win with six votes; Lavoie voted for Sims, Thomas voted for Rivera, and the rest voted for Holloway.

Accomplishments
With five individual immunity challenge wins, Holloway is tied with Colby Donaldson, Tom Westman, Terry Deitz, Ozzy Lusth, and Brad Culpepper for the most immunity challenge wins in a single season. Also, with four additional reward challenge wins, Holloway is tied with Deitz for the record of the highest number of overall post-merge challenge wins in a single season. Along with Westman, Holloway is one of only two contestants to win five immunity challenges and still win the season. Holloway also set two other Survivor records, by becoming the first person to successfully save himself with a hidden immunity idol and go on to win the season, and the first winner to receive only uncounted votes against him. Host Jeff Probst has since opined that Holloway will "go down as one of our top winners."

On May 6, while Worlds Apart was still airing, Holloway was listed among the 32 contestants (16 men and 16 women) eligible for the public vote on who would return for the upcoming 31st season, Survivor: Cambodia. As the theme of the new season was players who had only played once and did not win, he became ineligible when he won Worlds Apart. Although Holloway placed in the top ten on the men's side, he was rendered ineligible after being named Sole Survivor.

Career
Holloway worked in the oil industry as a driller for ten years prior to his stint on Survivor. After winning the Sole Survivor title, he founded an online T-shirt company called Sweet T's Designs. He started this company with a friend who, along with Holloway, had dreamed of owning a business since college. Holloway has since become a commercial real estate agent.

Personal life
In September 2021, Holloway married his long-time girlfriend Meg Maley, who was a houseguest on Big Brother 17.

References

External links
Official CBS biography page

1970s births
Living people
People from North Richland Hills, Texas
People from Odessa, Texas
Winners in the Survivor franchise
Survivor (American TV series) winners